The 2016 NHRA Mello Yello Drag Racing Season was announced on September 5, 2015.

There were 24 Top Fuel, Funny Car, and Pro Stock car events, and 16 Pro Stock Motorcycle events scheduled.

Schedule

1 The rules for the 4-Wide Nationals differ from other races:
 All cars will qualify on each lane as all four lanes will be used in qualifying.
 Three rounds with cars using all four lanes.
 In Rounds One and Two, the top two drivers (of four) will advance to the next round.
 The pairings are set as follows:
 Race One:  1, 8, 9, 16
 Race Two:  4, 5, 12, 13
 Race Three:  2, 7, 10, 15
 Race Four:  3, 6, 11, 14
 Semifinal One:  Top two in Race One and Race Two
 Semifinal Two:  Top two in Race Three and Race Four
 Finals:  Top two in Semifinal One and Semifinal Two
 Lane choice determined by times in previous round.  In first round, lane choice determined by fastest times.
 Drivers who advance in Rounds One and Two will receive 20 points for each round advancement.
 In Round Three, the winner of the race will be declared the race winner and will collect 40 points.  The runner-up will receive 20 points.  Third and fourth place drivers will be credited as semifinal losers.
2 Races at Pacific Raceway abandoned after semifinals because of rain and could not be finished because of ordinances in county.  There were two Top Fuel and Funny Car finals at Brainerd, and two Pro Stock finals at the U. S. Nationals (the NHRA and the two finalists agreed to conduct it at Clermont).  The first winner listed is the Saturday race, while the second winner is the Sunday (Brainerd) or Monday (U. S. Nationals) race.
* Finals televised on tape delay. Otherwise, finals will be televised live.  Note at Norwalk, the first two rounds were televised live on Fox Sports 1, and the remainder aired on tape delay on Fox Sports 2 after the NASCAR race, as Fox Sports 1 had coverage of the 2016 Copa America final.  The first Brainerd Top Fuel and Funny Car, and the first Lucas Oil Raceway Pro Stock (car) final aired on tape delay (FS1).  The Pro Stock (car and motorcycle) and the second Top Fuel and Funny Car finals at Brainerd aired live.  At the U. S. Nationals, the Top Fuel, Funny Car, Pro Stock Motorcycle finals and the second Pro Stock (car) finals will air on Fox live.

Notable events
  NHRA and ESPN mutually agreed to end their television coverage agreement following the 2015 season. The 2016 season was to be the final year of a five-year rights extension deal that took effect in 2012.
 NHRA and Fox Sports jointly announced that starting in 2016 the NHRA Mello Yello Drag Racing Series will be televised by Fox Sports 1 (FS1). The channel will provide coverage of Friday and Saturday qualifying and Sunday eliminations for each NHRA Mello Yello Series event, with a minimum of 16 Sunday eliminations shows to be presented in a live coverage format.  The Western Swing and the U. S. Nationals will be broadcast live on the Fox broadcast network, whose broadcasts will be labeled as Fox NHRA. All tape-delayed races will air as same-day delays after FS1 NASCAR coverage.
 NHRA and Fox Sports jointly announced the TV schedule for 2016, although with the addition of the Topeka race in December (the NHRA was legally unable to announce the Topeka race until new ownership group was confirmed), the television schedule for the Kansas round, which does not have a NASCAR conflict, it is expected to be live.
 The NHRA will cease offering points for setting a national record elapsed time, and will no longer require a run to be backed up within one percent in order to set the record, as points are not offered for such records.

Final standings

References

External links
 Official website
 Official NHRA Drag Racing Podcasts
 Drag Race Central The Latest NHRA News and Analysis

NHRA Camping World Drag Racing Series
2016 in American motorsport